Stiphropus is a genus of crab spiders in the family Thomisidae, containing twenty one species from Africa and Asia.

Species
 Stiphropus affinis Lessert, 1923 — South Africa
 Stiphropus bisigillatus Lawrence, 1952 — South Africa
 Stiphropus dentifrons Simon, 1895 — Gabon, Congo, Bioko
 Stiphropus drassiformis (O. P.-Cambridge, 1883) — East, South Africa
 Stiphropus duriusculus (Simon, 1885) — India
 Stiphropus falciformus Yang, Zhu & Song, 2006 — China
 Stiphropus gruberi Ono, 1980 — Sumatra
 Stiphropus intermedius Millot, 1942 — Ivory Coast
 Stiphropus lippulus Simon, 1907 — Guinea-Bissau
 Stiphropus lugubris Gerstäcker, 1873 — East Africa
 Stiphropus melas Jezequel, 1966 — Ivory Coast
 Stiphropus minutus Lessert, 1943 — Congo
 Stiphropus monardi Lessert, 1943 — Congo
 Stiphropus myrmecophilus Huang & Lin, 2020 — China
 Stiphropus niger Simon, 1886 — West Africa
 Stiphropus ocellatus Thorell, 1887 — China, Myanmar, Vietnam
 Stiphropus sangayus Barrion & Litsinger, 1995 — Philippines
 Stiphropus scutatus Lawrence, 1927 — Namibia
 Stiphropus sigillatus (O. P.-Cambridge, 1883) — Sri Lanka
 Stiphropus soureni Sen, 1964 — India, Nepal, Bhutan
 Stiphropus strandi Spassky, 1938 — Central Asia

References

Thomisidae
Araneomorphae genera
Spiders of Africa
Spiders of Asia